The following is a non-exhaustive list of vineyards and wineries from around the world.

Argentina
 Adrianna Vineyard, Mendoza
Bodega Catena Zapata, Mendoza

Australia

New South Wales
 Botobolar Vineyard
 De Bortoli Wines
 Wyndham Estate

South Australia

Tasmania
 Bruny Island Premium Wines
 Moorilla Estate

Victoria
 Brown Brothers Milawa Vineyard
 De Bortoli Wines
 Tahbilk

Western Australia

Bulgaria
 Winery Balar AD, Upper Thracian Plain
 Villa Melnik Winery

Canada
Colio Estate Wines
Diamond Estates Wines & Spirits Ltd.
Gaspereau Vineyards
Haywire Winery
Pelee Island Winery
Prince Edward County Wine
Strewn Winery
Vignoble Carone

Chile
 Concha y Toro Winery

England
Chapel Down
Denbies Wine Estate
Sedlescombe vineyard
Squerryes Estate
Stanlake Park Wine Estate
Wickham Vineyards

France

 Château Branaire-Ducru
 Château Brane-Cantenac
 Château de Camensac
 Château Cheval Blanc
 Château de Curton
 Château Ducru-Beaucaillou
 Château Figeac
 Chateau Haut-Bages Liberal
 Château Haut-Bailly
 Château Haut-Brion
 Château Haut-Marbuzet
 Château Lafite Rothschild
 Château Lascombes
 Château Latour
 Château Leoville Las Cases
 Château Lynch-Moussas
 Château Margaux
 Château Montrose
 Château Mouton Rothschild
 Château Pétrus
 Château de Pommard
 Château Pontet-Canet
 Château Rauzan-Gassies
 Château Suau (Capian)
 Domaine Henri Milan
 Domaine Laroche

Germany

Mosel

Rheingau

Malta
 Ta' Betta Wine Estates

New Zealand
 Cloudy Bay Vineyards
 Grove Mill
 Montana Wines
 Pegasus Bay Vineyards
 Two Paddocks
 Villa Maria Estates
 Yealands Estate

Romania
Băbească neagră
Busuioacă de Bohotin
Cotnari
Dealing Mare
Fetească albă
Fetească neagră
Fetească regală
Grasă de Cotnari
Halewood
Jidvei
Murfatlar
Tămâioasă Românească

South Africa

United States

 Chalone Vineyard
 Chateau Montelena
 Chateau Morrisette Winery
 Clos Du Val Winery
 David Bruce Winery
 E & J Gallo Winery
 Freemark Abbey Winery
 Grgich Hills Estate
 Heitz Wine Cellars
 Inglenook Winery
 Kendall-Jackson
 Louis M. Martini Winery
 Mayacamas Vineyards
 Messina Hof
 Opus One Winery
 Remick Ridge Vineyards
 Ridge Vineyards
 Kedem Winery
 Rubicon Estate Winery
 Silverado Vineyards Winery
 Spring Mountain Vineyard
 Stag's Leap Wine Cellars
 Stags' Leap Winery
 Sterling Vineyards
 Trefethen Vineyards
 The Williamsburg Winery

See also

List of wine-producing countries
List of wine-producing regions
Lists of vineyards and wineries
Outline of wine
Wine

References

 
Lists of companies by industry
Agriculture-related lists